Lulu Mall Thiruvananthapuram  is a shopping mall located in Thiruvananthapuram, the capital city of Kerala, India. The shopping  mall is located along the side of National Highway 66 at Aakkulam near Technopark the largest IT park in India. The mall has 300+ national and international brands and 12 anchor stores including a Lulu Hypermarket, largest indoor entertainment zone in the country, a multilevel car parking space for more than 3,800 cars. It also has a food court with a capacity for 2500 people serving various regional, international and specialty cuisines. The mall has a 12 screen Superplex Multiplex including kerala’s first IMAX screen, 4DX screen by PVR cinemas. The property is owned and managed by M.A. Yusuff Ali, the chairman and managing director of LuLu Group International.

History
The construction was started in August 2016 but the works were interrupted several times due to the COVID-19 pandemic restrictions put up by both the State and Central Governments which costed an additional ₹ 220 crores for the project. It was inaugurated by Sri. Pinarayi Vijayan, the honourable Chief Minister of Kerala in the presence of H.E. Dr. Thani bin Ahmed Al Zeyoudi, the honourable Minister for Foreign Trade United Arab Emirates on the 16th of December, 2021 and opened to the public on 17 December 2021.

Description and features

The shopping mall is located along the side of National Highway 66 at Aakkulam. The mall has a parking space for up to 3,800 cars with traffic management systems like ANPR. The mall has a food court with a capacity for 2,500 people, which is the largest in the country, and a 12 screen multiplex which include  4DX  screen and IMAX also by PVR Cinemas.

Transport 
 Kochuveli Railway Station, 
 Thiruvananthapuram Central railway station, 
 Central bus station Thiruvananthapuram,  
 Trivandrum International Airport, 
 Vizhinjam International Seaport,

Gallery

See also
 Mall of Travancore
Artech Central Mall
Taurus Centrum

References

External links
 LuLu Group

Shopping malls in Thiruvananthapuram
2021 establishments in Kerala
Shopping malls established in 2021